PP-268 Kot Addu-cum-Muzaffargarh is a Constituency of Provincial Assembly of Punjab.

General elections 2013

General elections 2008

See also
 PP-267 Rahim Yar Khan-XIII
 PP-269 Kot Addu-I

References

External links
 Election commission Pakistan's official website
 Awazoday.com check result
 Official Website of Government of Punjab

Provincial constituencies of Punjab, Pakistan
PP-253

Constituencies of Muzaffargarh
Politics of Muzaffargarh
Constituencies of Pakistan